Betty Tung (born Betty Chiu Hung-ping; born 6 May 1936) is a Hong Kong philanthropist and the former president of Hong Kong Red Cross.

Early life 
Tung was born at Tsan Yuk Hospital in Sai Ying Pun, Hong Kong. She is daughter of Chiu Cheuk-Yue, an architect, who had three wives. Her mother is second wife of her family. Tung finished her secondary school at St.Paul's Co-educational College and went to United Kingdom study Nursing.

Tung held a number of philanthropic roles in Hong Kong, including founding member and honorary adviser of the Concerted Efforts Resources Centre, an organisation providing support for young people and migrants from the Chinese mainland. She was also an honorary sponsor of the All-Hong Kong Federation of Women. In 1998, she was appointed president of the Hong Kong Red Cross.

Personal life 
In 1981, Tung married politician Tung Chee-hwa, who later became the first Chief Executive of Hong Kong from 1997 to 2005. Together they have three children.

References

21st-century Hong Kong people
Hong Kong philanthropists
Living people
1936 births